This is a list of airports in the Northwest Territories. It includes all Nav Canada certified and registered water and land airports, aerodromes and heliports in the Canadian territory of the Northwest Territories.


List of airports and heliports

The list is sorted by the name of the community served; click the sort buttons in the table header to switch listing order.

Defunct airports

See also

 List of airports in the Fort Simpson area

References

External links
 NWT airports (official site)

 
Northwest Territories
Airports